The Diet of Istria was the regional parliament of the Margravate of Istria within the Austrian Littoral of the Austro-Hungarian Empire. It was founded in 1861 and based in Poreč.

Provincial captains 
The speakers of the Istrian Diet were titled provincial captains (Italian: capitano provinciale/pl. capitani provinciali, German: Landeshauptmann/pl. Landeshauptleute, Slovenian: deželni glavar) 

 4 March 1849 – 6 April 1861: Baron Friedrich von Grimschitz (1793–1863)
 6 April 1861 – 25 September 1861: Gian Paolo, marchese Polesini (1818–1882)
 25 September 1861 – 16 April 1868: Francesco, marchese Polesini
 16 April 1869 – 23 January 1889: Francesco Vidulich (1819–1889)
 23 January 1889 – 24 October 1903: Matteo Campitelli (1828–1906) 
 24 October 1903 – 3 April 1916: Lodovico Rizzi (1859–1945) 
 3 April 1916 – 9 November 1918: Luigi Lasciac

See also

 Diet of Dalmatia

References

History of Istria
Legislatures of Austria-Hungary
1861 establishments in the Austrian Empire